The Łódź Gay Murderer is an unidentified Polish serial killer who operated in Łódź from 1988 to 1993. He murdered seven men, all of them homosexuals.

Circumstances of the crimes 
From 1988 to 1993, a series of murders took place in Łódź. All victims were connected by the fact that they were gay, died in their own flats and right after or during sexual intercourse. The perpetrator stole, among other things, TVs, videos, jewelry, cash and other items from the apartments of the murdered men. The victims died by strangling, stabbing or being beaten to death. The murders were not planned because the instruments of the crime were objects from the victims' flats.

At the turn of the 1980s and 1990s in the larger cities, Polish gay men would cruise around looking for new social contacts.

Victims 
The victims of the serial killer and the circumstances around their deaths:

 Stefan W. (age 37) – murdered on June 19, 1988 - the corpse was found on June 27 in his apartment at Grabowa Street; the perpetrator tied up the victim with a wire, and then stabbed him with a knife that was found at the scene.
 Jacek C. (age 40) – murdered on July 30, 1989 - the corpse was found on August 4 in his apartment at Ernst Thalmann Street (now at Cardinal Stefan Wyszyński avenue); the perpetrator tied up the victim with a string and a trouser belt; the victim was suffocated with a cloth that had been pushed in his mouth.
 Bogdan J. (age 50) – murdered on November 21, 1989 - the corpse was found two days later in his apartment at Łanowa Street, stabbed with a knife during sexual intercourse.
 Andrzej S. (age 41) – murdered on February 25, 1990 - the corpse was found on March 5 in his apartment at Gładka Street, stabbed with a knife.
 Jakub M. (age 41) – murdered on July 31, 1990 - the corpse was found on the same day in a forest near Głowno, strangled.
 Jan D. (age 48) – murdered on February 20, 1992 - the corpse was found on the same day in his home on the Łagiewniki estate, beaten to death.
 Kazimierz K. (age 62) – murdered on July 11, 1993 - the corpse was found the next day in his apartment at Konstytucyjna Street; the perpetrator trampled the victim and then strangled him.

Perpetrator 
After the last murder, committed in July 1993, an important witness appeared, who had sex with a young man named Roman. The witness met with Roman the previous day, where they went to Kazimierz K.'s apartment. When all the guests left, the host and Roman stayed in the apartment. The following day, Kazimierz K. was found dead. The witness who brought Roman to the victim's home testified that he had told him a lot about himself. The young man said that he was raped by an educator from the reformatory when he was 15. He was supposedly working in the Eskimo cotton industry and lived with his mother in the area of Rzgowska Street. He was 27 years old, 1.78 m tall, with hazel eyes and dark blond hair combed to the side. He also had tattoos: a dot with a left eye, a laryngeal dot and letters on the fingers on the left hand.

Aftermath 
In 2007, policemen from the Łódź Archives took interest in the murder series.

See also
List of fugitives from justice who disappeared

References 

1988 murders in Poland
1980s murders in Poland
1993 murders in Poland
1990s murders in Poland
Fugitives
Fugitives wanted by Poland
Murder in Poland
Polish serial killers
Unidentified serial killers
Violence against gay men
Violence against men in Europe